Acremodontina atypica is a species of sea snail, a marine gastropod mollusk in the family Trochaclididae, the false top snails.

Distribution
This species is endemic to the Three Kings Islands, New Zealand, at a depth of 260 m.

References

 Powell A. W. B., New Zealand Mollusca, William Collins Publishers Ltd, Auckland, New Zealand 1979 
 Marshall, B.A. (1995). Recent and Tertiary Trochaclididae from the Southwest Pacific (Mollusca: Gastropoda: Trochoidea). The Veliger. 38 : 92-115

External links
 To World Register of Marine Species
 A.W.B. Powell,  New species of marine mollusca from New Zealand, Discovery Report, National Institute of Oceanography of Great Britain, v. 15, 1937

atypica
Gastropods described in 1937